Dan R. Eastman (March 12, 1946 – June 8, 2010) was an American politician and car salesman who served as a member of the Utah State Senate.

Early life and education 
Eastman was born on March 12, 1946, in Salt Lake City. Afton Joyce Bowen and Robert Charles Eastman. He was educated in the Davis School District and graduated from Bountiful High School in 1964.

Eastman studied at Weber State University and Utah State University. Prior to his election to the Utah State Legislature, he served on the Davis School Board.

Career 
Eastman served in the Utah National Guard. He worked for some years in the banking industry in Southern Nevada and Salt Lake City before buying a Jeep dealership in Bountiful, Utah. Eastman operated the dealership for 20 years.

In 1999, Eastman sold his auto dealerships for an estimated $30 million. He was elected to the Utah State Senate after a campaign which was almost completely self-financed.

Eastman served as a member of the Utah State Senate, representing the state's 23rd senate district in Bountiful. He was elected in 2000 and 2004 but did not seek re-election in 2008. He was the Senate's Minority Whip from 2004 until 2008.

Personal life 
In 2001, Eastman was involved in a fatal car crash that killed a woman after he swerved his truck into oncoming traffic. No charges were ever filed although investigators concluded that it was Eastman's fault.

Eastman had five children with his wife, Claudette Eastman (née Crawford). Eastman died in Bountiful, Utah, on June 8, 2010, from heart failure. He was 64 years old.

References

External links
 Official Website

1948 births
2010 deaths
Republican Party Utah state senators
Utah State University alumni
Weber State University alumni
People from Bountiful, Utah
Businesspeople from Utah
21st-century American politicians
20th-century American businesspeople